Virginia's 6th House of Delegates district is one of 100 seats in the Virginia House of Delegates, the lower house of the state's bicameral legislature. District 6 covers all of Carroll County, Wythe County, and portions of Smyth County, Virginia. The district is represented by Republican Delegate Jeff Campbell.

District officeholders

Electoral history

External links
 

006
Carroll County, Virginia
Wythe County, Virginia
Smyth County, Virginia